Edmund "Eddie" Smith (October 25, 1902 in Arbroath, Scotland – August 7, 1978 in Andover, Massachusetts) was a Scottish-U.S. soccer forward.  He played professionally in both Scotland and the United States.  He also earned one cap with the U.S. national team.

Professional
Smith played for Scottish club Arbroath F.C. before moving to the United States where he signed with the Shawsheen Indians of Andover, Massachusetts.  In 1925, the Indians won the U S Open Cup 3-0 over the Canadian Club of Chicago.  In 1926, the Indians entered the American Soccer League, but folded twenty-six games into the 1926-1927 season.  In 1926, Smith joined Bethlehem Steel.  He played only four league games, scoring three goals, before moving to Detroit, Michigan.  He continued to play in the  Michigan Professional League playing for Holley Carburetor.

Soccer career
When he moved to Detroit, Smith played for Holly Carburetor and the Ford Motor Company.  He later moved back to Andover where he worked as a caretaker of the Spring Grove Cemetery.

National team
Smith earned one cap with the U.S. national team in a 6-2 win over Canada on November 6, 1926. Played at Ebbets Field N.Y.

See also
List of United States men's international soccer players born outside the United States

External links

References

1902 births
1978 deaths
People from Arbroath
Scottish footballers
American Soccer League (1921–1933) players
Arbroath F.C. players
Bethlehem Steel F.C. (1907–1930) players
Detroit Holley Carburetor players
British emigrants to the United States
Shawsheen Indians players
United States men's international soccer players
American soccer players
Association football forwards
Scottish expatriate sportspeople in the United States
Expatriate soccer players in the United States
Scottish expatriate footballers
Footballers from Angus, Scotland